Terkha is a small village situated in the district Nowshera of Khyber Pakhtunkhwa Province of Pakistan.

References

Populated places in Nowshera District